Datang (大塘镇) could refer to the following towns in China:

Datang, Foshan, in Sanshui District, Foshan, Guangdong
Datang, Shaoguan, in Qujiang District, Shaoguan, Guangdong
Datang, Lipu County, in Lipu County, Guangxi
Datang, Nanning, in Liangqing District, Nanning, Guangxi
Datang, Xincheng County, in Xincheng County, Guangxi
Datang, Yulin, Guangxi, in Yuzhou District, Yulin, Guangxi
Datang, Pingtang County, in Pingtang County, Guizhou
Datang, Pujiang County, Sichuan
Datang, Zhuji, in Zhuji, Zhejiang